The 1961–62 La Liga was the 31st season since its establishment. The season started on September 2, 1961, and finished on April 1, 1962.

Team locations 

Tenerife made their debut in La Liga, thus becoming the second Canarian team to play in the top tier.

League table

Results

Relegation play-offs 

|}

Pichichi Trophy

External links 
  Official LFP Site

1961 1962
1961–62 in Spanish football leagues
Spain